José Carlos Guimarães, known as Zezé, (born 2 May 1899, date of death unknown) was a Brazilian footballer. He played in 13 matches for the Brazil national football team from 1920 to 1923. He was also part of Brazil's squad for the 1920 South American Championship.

References

External links
 

1899 births
Year of death missing
Brazilian footballers
Brazil international footballers
Place of birth missing
Association footballers not categorized by position